The enzyme Serine-sulfate ammonia-lyase (EC 4.3.1.10) catalyzes the chemical reaction

L-serine O-sulfate + H2O  pyruvate + NH3 + sulfate

This enzyme belongs to the family of lyases, specifically ammonia lyases, which cleave carbon-nitrogen bonds.  The systematic name of this enzyme class is L-serine-O-sulfate ammonia-lyase (pyruvate-forming). It is also called (L-SOS)lyase.

References

 

EC 4.3.1
Enzymes of unknown structure